Yuanxi Subdistrict is a subdistrict in Yuancheng District, Heyuan, Guangdong province, China. , it has 11 residential communities and 4 villages under its administration.

See also 
 List of township-level divisions of Guangdong

References 

Township-level divisions of Guangdong
Heyuan